Bazouges-sur-le-Loir (literally Bazouges on the Loir) is a former commune in the Sarthe department in the region of Pays de la Loire in north-western France. On 1 January 2017, it was merged into the new commune Bazouges Cré sur Loir. Its population was 1,215 in 2019.

See also
Communes of the Sarthe department

References

Former communes of Sarthe